The next Palestinian legislative election was scheduled for 22 May 2021, according to a decree by President Mahmoud Abbas on 15 January 2021, but was indefinitely postponed on 29 April 2021.

History

Mahmoud Abbas was elected President of the Palestinian National Authority on 9 January 2005 for a four-year term that ended on 9 January 2009. The last elections for the Palestinian Legislative Council (PLC) were held on 25 January 2006. There have not been any elections either for president or for the legislature since these two elections. Elections since these dates have only been for local offices.

In February 2007, Saudi-sponsored negotiations led to the Hamas & Fatah Mecca Agreement signed by Mahmoud Abbas on behalf of Fatah and Khaled Mashal on behalf of Hamas to form a unity government. The new government was called on to achieve Palestinian national goals as approved by the Palestine National Council, the clauses of the Basic Law and the National Reconciliation Document (the "Prisoners' Document") as well as the decisions of the Arab summit.

In March 2007, the PLC established a national unity government, with 83 representatives voting in favour and three against. Government ministers were sworn in by Mahmoud Abbas, the chairman of the Palestinian Authority, at a ceremony held simultaneously in Gaza and Ramallah. In June that year, renewed fighting broke out between Hamas and Fatah. In the course of the June 2007 Battle of Gaza, Hamas exploited the near total collapse of Palestinian Authority forces in Gaza and seized control of Gaza, ousting Fatah officials. President Mahmoud Abbas then dismissed the Hamas-led Palestinian Authority government and outlawed the Hamas militia.

In September 2007, President Mahmoud Abbas of Fatah unilaterally changed the electoral laws of 2005 from the PLC being half proportionally elected and half constituency/first past the post-based to full proportional representation. He insisted he could issue the change by decree as long as the PLC was unable to convene. The move was seen as a bid to lessen the chances of Hamas in the next election. Hamas, which controlled the PLC, declared the move illegal.

By 2010, the security and economic situation of the residents of Gaza had deteriorated dramatically. With financial backing from Iran, Hamas had used its position in Gaza to launch thousands of rockets at Israel. Hamas had long expressed interest in taking control of the West Bank and strengthening its foothold in the area and stated its intent to use the elections as a means to undermine the stability of the Palestinian Authority.

Attempts to resolve election issue

In September 2008, it was suggested that Abbas' term be extended one year or that the PLC be dissolved a year early in order to hold both elections at the same time. Hamas objected to holding simultaneous elections, arguing that the presidential election should have been held in January 2009 and the parliamentary elections in 2010. Hamas also claimed that the Speaker of the PLC, Aziz al-Dewik, a Hamas member, became the Palestinian president after Abbas' term ended on 9 January 2009 until the holding of new elections.

Fatah argued that elections should have been held in January 2010 since the Palestinian election law calls for presidential and legislative council elections to be held simultaneously, four years after the date of the later. Since the legislative council elections were held in 2006 (a year after the presidential election) new elections for both should have been held in January 2010. In reconciliation talks held in March 2009 in Cairo, Egypt, Hamas and Fatah agreed to hold the elections by 25 January 2010.

In February 2010, local government elections were called in the West Bank and the Gaza Strip for July 2010. The West Bank Palestinian government decided to postpone the elections, arguing that it wanted to safeguard "national unity". In December 2010, the Palestinian High Court of Justice ruled that once the cabinet calls elections it does not have authority to cancel them. After being postponed several times, the local government elections took place in October and November 2012 and covered only the West Bank. Presidential and parliamentary election to the Palestinian Authority were postponed several times because of intra-Palestinian political disputes between Fatah and Hamas from the original date of 17 July 2010.

In February 2011, following the resignation of Saeb Erekat as chief negotiator with Israel for the Israeli–Palestinian peace process following the release of the Palestine Papers, which were harshly critical of the PLO's concessions, the PLO Executive Committee announced intentions to hold elections before October. Abbas's followed the announcement with calls for "the spirit of change in Egypt" to inspire Palestinian unity. His aide Yasser Abed Rabbo said: "The Palestinian leadership decided to hold presidential and legislative elections within September. It urges all the sides to put their differences aside."

Fawzi Barhoum, a spokesman for Hamas, said that Abbas didn't have the legitimacy to make the electoral call. "Hamas will not take part in this election. We will not give it legitimacy. And we will not recognize the results."

In October 2011, Abbas sent a proposal to Hamas for another general election, preferably to be held in early 2012. It was suggested that Hamas would be more willing to participate in another election following the Gilad Shalit prisoner exchange which boosted Hamas' standing in Gaza. In November 2011, an election date on 4 May 2012 was preliminarily agreed on. However, due to further bickering, the election could not be held by that date.

On 20 December 2013, Hamas called on the Palestinian Authority to form a six-month national unity government that would finally hold the long-delayed general election. Following the upgrade of the UN status of Palestine to non-member observer state, it was proposed that general state elections would follow in 2013, in line with unity talks of Fatah and Hamas. In April 2014, agreement was reached between Fatah and Hamas to form a unity government, which happened on 2 June 2014, and for general elections to take place within 6 months of the agreement.

Elections had previously been scheduled for April and October 2014 in accordance with the Fatah–Hamas Gaza Agreement of April 2014. However the elections were then delayed indefinitely. In October 2017, Hamas and Fatah signed a reconciliation deal in which Hamas agreed to dissolve the unity government in Gaza and hold general elections by the end of 2018, but the elections again were not held. Mahmoud Abbas announced on 26 September 2019 in a speech at the UN General Assembly that he intended to set a date for elections once he returned to the West Bank. Hamas responded by indicating that it was ready to hold "comprehensive and general elections", but on 6 November, Hamas and Palestinian Islamic Jihad (PIJ) rejected Abbas's terms for holding elections, which required candidates to recognize the agreements signed by the PLO to be able to run.

Suspension
On 11 November 2019, Abbas said that there would be no new Palestinian elections unless they include East Jerusalem and the Gaza Strip. On 26 November 2019, Hamas confirmed that it had agreed with the Palestinian Central Elections Commission to participate in elections and that Hamas would not accept the exclusion of Jerusalem under any circumstances. Abbas announced in early December that elections would take place in a few months. On 10 December 2019, the Palestinian Authority asked Israel to allow East Jerusalem residents to vote in the planned elections, a request that Israeli officials said would now go to the security cabinet. In 2020, Fatah and Hamas agreed on elections between February and March 2021.

On 14 March 2021, a Palestinian Authority official said Arab residents of Jerusalem would participate in the Palestinian general elections. However, a senior Israeli government official said that no decision had yet been taken. Abbas and other Palestinian officials had in the past said there would be no elections without the participation of Arab residents of Jerusalem. The EU requested permission from Israel to observe the elections in Jerusalem but according to a European Commission spokesperson on 19 April 2021, "Despite continuous contact with the Israeli authorities, over the past seven weeks, a reply granting access has yet to be received." Cancelling the elections, even if over Jerusalem, carries risks for Abbas. On 21 April 2021, presidential spokesman Nabil Abu Rudeineh emphasized "the leadership’s commitment to conducting Palestinian elections in accordance with the presidential decrees and the specified dates." On 29 April 2021, ahead of a scheduled leadership meeting Hamas had rejected the idea of postponing elections and refused to attend the meeting amid speculation that Mahmoud Abbas's Fatah Party would seek to delay or cancel them. Hamas said voting in East Jerusalem does not need Israeli permission.

Announcing a postponement on Palestinian TV, Abbas said on 29 April: "Facing this difficult situation, we decided to postpone the date of holding legislative elections until the participation of Jerusalem and its people is guaranteed."

Reactions
Hamas said "We received with regret the Fatah [group] and Palestinian Authority’s decision represented through its chairman, Mr Mahmoud Abbas, to disrupt the Palestinian elections." and called the step a "a coup against the path of national partnership and consensus."

EU foreign policy chief Josep Borrell said "The decision to postpone the planned Palestinian elections, including the legislative elections originally scheduled for 22 May, is deeply disappointing," that "We strongly encourage all Palestinian actors to resume efforts to build on the successful talks between the factions over recent months. A new date for elections should be set without delay." and "We reiterate our call on Israel to facilitate the holding of such elections across all of the Palestinian territory, including in East Jerusalem."

United Nations Special Coordinator for the Middle East Peace Process, Tor Wennesland, said in a statement "The holding of transparent and inclusive elections throughout the Occupied Palestinian Territory, including in East  Jerusalem as stipulated in prior agreements remains essential for renewing the legitimacy and credibility of Palestinian institutions and opening the path to re-establishing Palestinian national unity. This will also set the path toward meaningful negotiations to end the occupation and realize a two-state solution based on UN resolutions, international law and previous agreements. Setting a new and timely date for elections would be an important step in reassuring the Palestinian people that their voices will be heard."

Arrangements for the election
The legislative election was to have been held in the areas administered by the Palestinian Authority. Hamas welcomed the announcement, as did the UN and the EU, and a number of countries. Hamas, Fatah and other groups agreed on 9 February on the "mechanisms" for the elections, which includes an electoral court and commitments to open voting. The international community previously set conditions for the Palestinian government, following the Principles set forth in 2006 by the Quartet on the Middle East: nonviolence, recognition of Israel, and acceptance of previous agreements, including the Roadmap, by both sides.

The Palestinian Central Elections Commission (CEC) was conducting the elections. CEC Chairman Hanna Nasir said in January 2021 that "about two million Palestinians in Jerusalem, the West Bank, and Gaza Strip are eligible to vote." On 2 March 2021, after the expiration of the deadline for registration to vote, the CEC said that 2.6 million of the 2.8 million eligible voters in the West Bank and Gaza, 93% of the total, had registered.

Lists
The March 31 midnight deadline for submissions of electoral lists saw 36 lists officially presented, including:

Fatah, led by Mahmoud Aloul
Freedom, headed by Nasser al-Qudwa and Fadwa Barghouti, the wife of Marwan Barghouti
Hamas (running as "Jerusalem is Our Promise"), led by Khalil al-Hayya
United Left, a joint list of the Palestinian People's Party and the Palestinian Democratic Union, led by Fadwa Khoder.
Palestinian National Initiative, led by Mustafa Barghouti
Popular Front for the Liberation of Palestine (running as "The People's Pulse").
Democratic Front for the Liberation of Palestine (running as "Democratic Change").
Together We Can, led by former Prime Minister Salam Fayyad
The Future, led by Mohammed Dahlan

Opinion polls
A December 2020 poll by the Palestinian Center for Policy and Survey Research (PCPSR) found that Fatah would win 38% of the vote,  Hamas would win 34%, and the remaining parties would split 10% of the vote with 19% of voters undecided. The same poll also found 52% of Palestinians think elections held under the present conditions would not be fair and free. A number of obstacles to a successful election remain. The same pollsters released results on 23 March 2021, based on "face-to-face interviews with 1,200 Palestinians across the occupied West Bank and Gaza, with a margin of error of 3%", that said "a single Fatah list would win 43% of the vote and Hamas would win 30%, with 18% of voters undecided." The poll found that if Fatah, Hamas and Marwan Barghouti run with their own lists then 28% of the public said they would vote for the latter while 22% said they would vote for the official Fatah list.

An October 2021 opinion poll conducted by the Jerusalem Media & Communication Centre in cooperation with the Friedrich Ebert Foundation described "citizens’ thirst for legislative and presidential elections" with more than 70% saying that a new date for elections should be set while half said they had planned to participate in the postponed elections and 42% not. The poll said Fatah would win the parliamentary election if it was held today with 34% for Fatah (44% in the Gaza Strip and 27% in the West Bank) and 10% for Hamas while 34% said they would not vote.
                        
A December 2021 poll by PSCSR found 38% for Hamas, 35% for Fatah, 9% for other parties and 18% undecided. Three months earlier, the vote for Hamas stood at 37% and Fatah at 32%.

Notes

References

Sources

 
 

Palestine
Elections in the State of Palestine
Fatah–Hamas conflict
Cancelled elections